University West is a university college (högskola) located in Trollhättan, in southwestern Sweden. University West was initially called University College of Trollhättan/Uddevalla and had three campuses, in Trollhättan, Uddevalla and Vänersborg. In 2008 all activities were relocated to new facilities in Trollhättan.

University West offers bachelor's (first cycle), master's (second cycle) and doctoral (third cycle) programmes within a variety of fields like IT, economics and management, health studies, education and engineering. In 2020 there were 27 first cycle programmes and 17 second and third cycle programmes.

As of 2021 there are 13,000 students enrolled and the university employs more than 700 people, including more than 60 professors.

Work-integrated learning in education and research 
University West implements work-integrated learning (WIL) in its education and research. The university sees both theoretical and practical knowledge as crucial in education and knowledge creation. Through WIL, students get an opportunity to apply theoretical knowledge to real-life situations and are able to bring back practical experiences into the classroom, thereby improving learning and the student's grasp of his or her field.

University West conducts extensive and internationally recognized research within the field of work-integrated learning and has a unique doctoral programme i WIL. The university is also a member of WACE, an international organisation aimed at strengthening cooperative and work-integrated learning around the world.

Departments and Schools 

The university consists of four academic departments/schools.

 School of Business, Economics and IT
 Department of Social and Behavioural Studies
 Department of Health Sciences
 Department of Engineering Sciences

The current vice-chancellor of the university is Martin Hellström

See also 
List of universities and colleges in Sweden

References

External links 
Official website

West